Ārlava parish is an administrative unit of Talsi Municipality, Latvia.

See also 
 Nogale Castle

Parishes of Latvia
Talsi Municipality